John Burke Glaiser (July 28, 1894 – March 7, 1959) was a Major League Baseball pitcher who played for the Detroit Tigers in .

External links

1894 births
1959 deaths
Detroit Tigers players
Major League Baseball pitchers
Baseball players from Texas
St. Edward's Hilltoppers baseball players